Eric Ulrich (born February 13, 1985) is a former member of the New York City Council  representing the 32nd district. His constituency includes the neighborhoods of Belle Harbor, Breezy Point, Broad Channel, Hamilton Beach, Howard Beach, Lindenwood, Neponsit, Ozone Park, Rockaway Beach, Rockaway Park, South Ozone Park and Woodhaven in Queens. He is a Republican.

Ulrich is a moderate Republican, breaking from conservatives on minimum wage legislation, his vocal opposition to President Donald Trump, and his support for rent stabilization. As City Councilman, he led oversight committees on Hurricane Sandy relief efforts, and publicly expressed disapproval with their speed and efficiency. Ulrich's constituents reside in parts of the Rockaway Peninsula and Howard Beach which were disproportionately affected by the storm. In public statements Ulrich called the relief efforts a "bureaucratic nightmare", said the city's chosen contractors were incapable of handling the residents' needs, and recommended the head of the city's Build-it-Back program be fired by the Mayor.

Life and career
Eric Ulrich was born at Jamaica Hospital on February 13, 1985. He grew up in Ozone Park in Queens, where he attended P.S. 63Q (Old South), a public elementary school, and later, Nativity of the Blessed Virgin Mary, a Catholic elementary school. Raised by his mother with the help of his maternal grandparents, Ulrich contemplated a vocation to the priesthood.  After graduating from Cathedral Prep. Seminary High School in 2003, he became the first member of his family to earn a college degree. He holds a BA from St. Francis College and received his MPA in 2016 from Baruch College, City University of New York. Ulrich is divorced and has one daughter, Lily.

While in college, Ulrich worked for the Transportation Security Administration at JFK Airport. He taught religion at Xaverian High School (Bay Ridge, Brooklyn). He previously served as the President of the Our Neighbors Civic Association of Ozone Park. He belongs to the Knights of Columbus, Kiwanis Club of Howard Beach, Jamaica Rotary Club, the National Political Science Honor Society-Pi Sigma Alpha, and was also elected to New York Republican State Committee (2007-2013).

On February 24, 2009, at age 24 Ulrich won the non-partisan special election for New York City Council to replace Joseph Addabbo Jr. who was elected to New York State Senate in 2008. Ulrich was re-elected in 2009, 2013 and again in 2017. He is currently term-limited in 2021 and cannot seek re-election.

On January 5, 2022, Ulrich was appointed Senior Advisor to Mayor Eric Adams.

New York City Council
In February 2009, during a special election, Ulrich was elected to a seat on the New York City Council, defeating three more senior candidates in the 32nd district in southwest Queens. Ulrich was re-elected in November 2009, in 2013, and in 2017. He is barred by term limits from seeking re-election in 2021.

Ulrich broke with the New York State Republican Party platform on several issues, and says he is proud of his independence from party positions. He voted in favor of a minimum wage raise and voted twice to boost rent stabilization, making him the only Republican to do so.

Ulrich supported Melissa Mark-Viverito during her run for Council Speaker in 2013, an unpopular position for Republicans. Queens Republican Chair Bob Turner said that supporting Viverito "wouldn't help" Ulrich's standing in Republican circles. Ulrich had chided Mark-Viverito for refusing to recite the Pledge of Allegiance with other Council-members during government functions, a position she changed in 2013 prior to her run for Speaker.

For fiscal year 2015, Ulrich secured a $400,000 allocation to support local veterans' direct services. Five organizations were nominated to help veterans and their families with employment, mental health, and legal issues. Funding also supports programming for women veterans and newly returned service members. He supports the consolidation of the city's three library systems.

Hurricane Sandy recovery
Ulrich started a Committee with Mark Treyger to monitor the recovery effort following Hurricane Sandy. Ulrich sharply criticized the pace of the recovery effort during oversight meetings in 2015 and 2016. He pointed to Build-it-Back as ineffective, pointing to cases where homeowners had been relocated for construction, only to learn that months had gone by with no development.

Chair of New York Council Veterans Committee
Ulrich serves as Chair of the New York City Council's Veterans Committee. Following her election to Council Speaker (in which she had received support from Ulrich), Melissa Mark-Viverito appointed Ulrich to his Veterans Affairs post. Ulrich refuted speculation that his support for Viverito was a quid pro quo for obtaining his Committee Chairmanship, and instead said that supporting her was his best option for bringing her attention to the needs of his constituents. Since assuming the committee chairship in early 2014, Ulrich has held hearings on a range of topics examining local veterans' issues and how New York City government can combat these challenges.

Following remarks by presidential candidate Donald Trump that John McCain was not a war hero, Ulrich rejected his comments, calling them "a slap in the face to New York City’s veterans and their families, especially those who had been 'captured' as former POWs." Ulrich wrote a letter July 20, 2015 to Jamaica Hospital, urging the Board of Directors to remove Trump's name from the nursing home. The Trump Pavilion for Nursing and Rehabilitation was named after Mary Trump, and was built in 1975 with donations from Donald Trump's parents. The Trump name remains on the Pavilion.

Coronavirus; Oxiris Barbot 
In early April 2020, he and Democratic New York City Councilman Robert Holden wrote to Mayor de Blasio asking him to relieve Commissioner of Health of the City of New York Oxiris Barbot of her position "before it’s too late," saying her guidance on coronavirus had been disastrous.

Other campaigns

2012 State Senate bid
In 2012, Ulrich ran for New York State Senate against incumbent Democratic Sen. Joe Addabbo in Senate District 15. While the Queens Republican Party endorsed Juan D. Reyes who ran against him in the primary, Ulrich prevailed nonetheless. During the campaign, Ulrich criticized Sen. Addabbo, who publicly said there was "an understanding" that Resorts World Casino in Queens would hire 70-80% locally from Queens. The Daily News found that 61% of the "top tier" positions were held by employees residing in Queens County. On Election Day, Ulrich was defeated by Addabbo.

Potential run for Mayor of New York City
Media speculated that Ulrich was a potential challenger to Bill De Blasio in the 2017 mayoral race, after his  2013 press conference on an unplowed street in Queens, criticizing the newly elected mayor for his handling of the heavy snowfall. Ulrich launched an exploratory committee on May 12, 2016, but did not ultimately run.

Comments on 2016 presidential campaign
Ulrich endorsed John Kasich over Trump during his presidential run in 2016. When Trump became the presumptive nominee, Ulrich said he disliked Trump's offensive comments and speeches, but said he may vote for him should he "come around by [Election Day]".

2019 New York City Public Advocate special election
Ulrich ran in the 2019 New York City Public Advocate special election. As the election was nonpartisan, Ulrich ran on the line titled Common Sense. Some of his endorsements included the Bronx GOP, Brooklyn GOP, Manhattan GOP, Queens GOP, and Staten Island GOP, as well as the New York Daily News, which, on February 20, 2019, wrote "Ulrich stands apart on a key issue of the day: He welcomed Amazon coming to Long Island City as the rest of the field was tripping over itself to denounce the deal." In addition to supporting Amazon coming to New York City, Ulrich is the only candidate to have opposed Mayor Bill de Blasio's plan to close Riker's Island and build community jails. In a debate that aired on NY1 in early February, Ulrich vowed to be Mayor de Blasio's "worst nightmare" if elected as Public Advocate.

In February 2019, New York Post contributor John Podhoretz wrote a column entitled "A Republican with a real chance to win an NYC-wide office,"  which was featured in the New York Post. Podhoretz's column cites private polling - not commissioned by Ulrich or any of the campaigns - “that suggests Ulrich has a real shot at winning” the special election, leading with 22 percent.

Senior Advisor to Eric Adams
On January 5, 2022 Ulrich was named as Senior Advisor to the Mayor by New York City Mayor Eric Adams. On May 3, 2022, Ulrich was appointed as commissioner of the NYC Department of Buildings.

Gambling Probe
On Nov. 1, 2022 Investigators working for the Manhattan district attorney seized Ulrich's phone pursuant to a search warrant. The investigation centers around an illegal gambling ring, but Ulrich has not been charged with a crime.

On November 3, Ulrich resigned from his position as commissioner of the Buildings Department. Ulrich has not been charged with any wrongdoing and stated he chose to resign to rather than be an "unnecessary distraction for the Adams administration”.

Electoral history

References

External links
 NYC Council: District 32 - Eric Ulrich

1985 births
American political scientists
Schoolteachers from New York (state)
Living people
American people of German descent
Commissioners in New York City
New York City Council members
New York (state) Republicans
Public officeholders of Rockaway, Queens
St. Francis College alumni
21st-century American politicians
People from Ozone Park, Queens